The Great National Unity Order is a service award conferred by the 
Government of Vietnam for long process of devotion, have rendered great meritorious services. Specially, individuals have "rendered great meritorious services and recorded exceptionally outstanding achievements in the cause of building the great national unity block".

See also 
 Vietnam awards and decorations

References

Orders, decorations, and medals of Vietnam
Military awards and decorations of Vietnam
Awards established in 2003
2003 establishments in Vietnam